The season started with a change of coach (Gareth James) and a change of captain (Arwel Williams). Appointed vice captain was Mathew Scott. A level of ‘expectancy’ thus ensued and with a start of two competitive friendlies both at home, the league began in earnest with a traditionally unlucky fixture for the ‘Fera away at Cwmavon. Past history meant for nothing however and a well organised and structured performance ended in a fine 29–19 win. A repeat showing a week later at home to Brynamman and a 26–6 win, led to a position of a little over-confidence, ‘Fera narrowly exiting the Swansea Valley Cup in the 1st Round three days later away to Morriston. Back on track with a determined and physical victory at Bryncoch 25–15, the next home game was again against a traditional ‘bogey’ side Kenfig Hill. This was a typical ‘old style’ West Wales affair with yellow and red cards for both sides, Ystalyfera losing 11–29 after keeping in touch with the visitors for a greater part of the game. A return to Morriston for a league fixture saw a much better controlled performance with a 20–15 win, and a further win at Pencoed made it four continuous league away victories. The Pencoed win was the first in the season where Ystalyfera out-played their opponents in every area of the game, the hosts being unable to seek any avenue to secure a fight back. This repeated itself against Nantyffyllon home and self-confidence was building amongst the side. Then came Aberavon Green Stars away. In this game and in the subsequent losses home to Glynneath and away at Seven Sisters, the effort put in by individual players was noticeable, but the co-ordinated team tactics were missing and a struggle against well organised opponents ensued.

A five-week absence of any rugby allowed an opportunity to re-group and indeed the 23–11 victory at Brynamman in January was much like a fresh start to the season. The Welsh Plate 2nd Round tie at home to Glynneath was a well-contested affair, the ‘Fera missing out in extra time but playing a high standard of open rugby. The next five games were outstanding with a run of victories which established Ystalyfera as top four contenders in the league. Each match ‘grew’ out of its predecessor, and the teamwork with notable individual performances, brought the side through the West Wales Bowl Qualifiers – A Semi-Final against then top Division 3 West side Mumbles being earned. Those supporters who witnessed the 29–17 victory mid-week at Morriston, were blessed to see an exceptional and complete pulverisation of a Mumbles side who began as favourites and a reputation for fast open rugby with a talented set of backs. The match started as per the formbook with three quick tries for Mumbles in 10 minutes. However, for the next hour Ystalyfera broke, not so much like a wave but more of a tsunami, all over their opponents. Across the field ‘Fera overpowered and left Mumbles well beaten. The next league game was a revenge victory at home over Aberavon Green Stars and the commendable run of wins narrowly came to an end up at Seven Sisters 19–24. One way victories over Taibach and Morriston left the remaining League fixtures against the top two sides, both needing to beat Ystalyfera to guarantee their promotion. Both matches went by the formbook with Ystalyfera keeping the powder dry for the West Wales Bowl Final. Down at Dunvant a victory over opponents Glynneath saw Ystalyfera win West Wales Cup silverware for the first time in 72 years.

Other notable achievements this season have been a highest ever finish in the Welsh National League - 5th in Division 3 (a joint 43rd position out of 85 possible), and a record away win in the Welsh National League – 56–0 at Nantyffyllon. The final position was fair in that 'Fera lost both fixtures against the top three sides, sharing results with 4th placed Aberavon Green Stars and completing league doubles over the remaining lower seven teams. ‘Fera scored over 30 points on eight occasions and conceded over 30 three times.

Player achievements out of 46 who took part were appearances in every game (28) by props Gareth Jones and Daniel White – who is holding a continuous run of 50 chasing a Noir James record of 121. Damian James relentlessly increased his highest number of Tries scored total to 134 and a total career points score of 1,508. Whilst chasing this total with 884 points of his own, undoubtedly the biggest personal achievements this season have been in his first year as player coach Gareth James. His record 292 points in a season was augmented with the record points scored in a single game (45) versus Taibach away, matching a joint record of 4 penalties kicked in a single game versus Pencoed away and most conversions kicked in a season (55). Indeed, the only records not held by the James’ family at present is a season appearance total of 35 by Alan Jones and a penalty kick total of 40 by John Hicks. 3 players in the current squad have to date made over 300 appearances for the team, 16 players with over 100 appearances and 13 who have scored over 10 tries for the side so far.

Merits given are;

Coaches player Paul Davies

Clubman awards Neil Amber and Paul Morris

Most Improved Player Gareth Jones

Most Promising Tom Barry

Club (Committee) Player of the Year Paul Davies

Supporters Player of the Year Ashley Carter (26% of the vote)

Players Player of the Year Paul Davies (20% of the vote)

National league division 3 south west

Ystalyfera 2010/11 Season Results

Ystalyfera 2010/11 Season Player Stats

References

Sport in Neath Port Talbot